Artur Yevgenyevich Anisimov (born 31 December 1992) is a Russian football goalkeeper. He plays for FC Pari Nizhny Novgorod.

Club career
He made his debut in the Russian Second Division for FC KAMAZ Naberezhnye Chelny on 8 September 2012 in a game against FC Tyumen.

He made his Russian Football National League debut for FC Olimpiyets Nizhny Novgorod on 8 July 2017 in a game against FC Avangard Kursk.

He made his Russian Premier League debut for FC Nizhny Novgorod on 17 October 2021 in a game against PFC Krylia Sovetov Samara.

Career statistics

References

External links

1992 births
People from Naberezhnye Chelny
Living people
Russian footballers
Association football goalkeepers
FC KAMAZ Naberezhnye Chelny players
FC Nizhny Novgorod (2015) players
Russian First League players
Russian Second League players
Russian Premier League players
Sportspeople from Tatarstan